Events from the year 1754 in France.

Incumbents 
Monarch: Louis XV

Events
 
 
 
 
 28 May – The Battle of Jumonville Glen begins the French and Indian War in North America: 22-year-old George Washington leads a company of militia from the Colony of Virginia in an ambush on a force of 35 French Canadians.
 3 July – French and Indian War: Battle of Fort Necessity – George Washington surrenders Fort Necessity to French Capt. Louis Coulon de Villiers.

Births
 2 February – Charles Maurice de Talleyrand, French politician (d. 1838)
 15 January Jacques Pierre Brissot, French politician (d. 1795)
 17 February – Nicolas Baudin, French explorer (d. 1803)
 17 March – Madame Roland (Jeanne Marie Manon Philipon), French politician (d. 1793)
 9 August – Pierre Charles L'Enfant, French architect (d. 1825)
 18 August – François, marquis de Chasseloup-Laubat, French general (d. 1833)
 23 August – Prince Louis-Auguste, grandson and eventual successor (as Louis XVI) of the reigning King Louis XV (d. 1793)
 26 September – Joseph Proust, French chemist (d. 1826)
 9 December – Etienne Ozi, French composer (d. 1813)

Deaths
 

 4 July – Philippe Néricault Destouches, French dramatist (b. 1680)
 27 November – Abraham de Moivre, French mathematician (b. 1667)

See also

References

1750s in France